In the lead-up to World War I, there were three British naval missions to the Ottoman Empire, sent to help modernize and reform the Ottoman Navy. The missions were led by admirals Douglas Gamble (February 1909 – March 1910), Hugh Pigot Williams (April 1910 – April 1912), and Arthur Limpus (May 1912 – September 1914). Despite enjoying extensive formal authority, with the heads of the mission serving concurrently as Fleet Commanders of the Ottoman Navy, the success of the mission was limited due to political instability, pro-German tendencies within the leadership of the Young Turks, and the involvement of the Ottoman Empire in the Italo-Turkish War and the two Balkan Wars in 1911–1913, which led to naval defeats and the loss of several smaller units.

Sources
 
 

1900s in the Ottoman Empire
1910s in the Ottoman Empire
Ottoman Empire–United Kingdom relations
Ottoman Navy